Aphelocheirus aestivalis is a Palearctic species of  true bug. It is aquatic and wingless, covered in microscopic hairs that form a physical gill when underwater.

References

External links
Aquatic heteroptera recording scheme for Britain and Ireland

Hemiptera of Europe
Insects described in 1794